The Intendancy of Chiloé (Intendencia de Chiloé), was an ephemeral administrative division of the Spanish Empire that existed in Chiloé Archipelago between 1784 and 1789.

References

Bibliography

Intendancy of Chiloé
Intendancies of the Spanish Empire
Intendancy of Chiloé
Spanish colonization of the Americas
States and territories established in 1784
States and territories disestablished in 1789
Former colonies in South America